The 2007 Magyar Kupa, known as ( for sponsorship reasons), is the 81st edition of the tournament.

Final four

The final four was held on 29 and 30 December 2007 at the Szőnyi úti uszoda in Budapest.

Semi-finals

Final

See also
 2007–08 Országos Bajnokság I

External links
 Hungarian Water Polo Federaration 

Seasons in Hungarian water polo competitions
Hungary
Magyar Kupa